Sebastian Hering (21 August 1910 – 28 February 1978) was a German wrestler. He competed in the men's Greco-Roman featherweight at the 1936 Summer Olympics.

References

External links
 

1910 births
1978 deaths
German male sport wrestlers
Olympic wrestlers of Germany
Wrestlers at the 1936 Summer Olympics
Sportspeople from Munich
20th-century German people